Mosheh Oinounou (born May 21, 1982) is an American media executive who most recently served as executive producer of CBS Evening News.

Biography
Oinounou was raised in Prairie View, Illinois and graduated from Stevenson High School. He is a graduate of George Washington University where he received a BA in Political Communication and an MA in Security Policy Studies. He served as editor in chief of the school's biweekly newspaper, The GW Hatchet and was active in Hillel International. He began his media career as a producer at Fox News Channel, initially for Fox News Sunday and later as the network's embedded producer traveling with the 2008 McCain presidential campaign. He later worked as an international editor at Bloomberg TV where he covered the great recession and the 2011 Fukushima nuclear disaster.

In 2011 he joined CBS News as a senior producer on the team that helped launch  CBS This Morning and received a 2013 Emmy Award for Outstanding Investigative Journalism.  He then helped to establish CBSN, CBS' digital streaming channel where he served as the launch executive producer.  In January 2018, he was promoted to executive producer of the CBS Evening News with Jeff Glor where he oversaw daily operations and news programming. During his tenure the broadcast was nominated for multiple Emmys and won a Murrow Award. In May 2019, he announced he was departing CBS News.  He founded Mo Digital in 2020, consulting for media organizations on digital content strategy and programming, and runs a "news concierge" instagram account devoted to curating and explaining the headlines.

In 2022, he launched the regular Mo News Podcast and the Mo News newsletter on Bulletin.

Personal life
In July 2021, he married Alexandra Lauren Sall.

References

1982 births
Living people
CBS News people
Fox News people
American television producers
CBS executives
20th-century American Jews
George Washington University School of Media and Public Affairs alumni
21st-century American Jews